
Edwin Albert Power (12 February 1928 – 31 January 2004) was an English physicist and an emeritus professor of applied mathematics at University College London. He made several contributions to the field of non-relativistic quantum electrodynamics.

Life

Power was born in Honiton, England on 12 February 1928. He obtained his B.Sc and M.Sc in mathematics from University College London in 1948 and 1949 respectively. He obtained his Ph.D under the supervision of John Currie Gunn at the University of Glasgow, for which he obtained the Kelvin Prize in 1951 (the prize recognizes the best physics thesis of the year). His doctoral work concerned meson production from proton–proton collisions.

After his Ph.D, he worked at University College, where became professor of applied mathematics in 1967, and fellow in 1991. In 1953, he became a Commonwealth Fund Fellow. He then spent two years in the United States, one at Cornell University, one at Princeton University. While at Princeton, he and John Wheeler worked on electromagnetism and gravity, resulting in the proposition of "thermal geons" in a paper published in Reviews of Modern Physics in 1957.

Power then researched non-relativistic quantum electrodynamics, particularly the interactions between radiation fields and particles, and developed several techniques. In 1959, he and Sigurd Zienau published a paper on the Coulomb gauge and its relation to the shape of spectral lines, non-relativistic Lamb shift, and other phenomena in the Philosophical Transactions of the Royal Society of London A. Power also studied the relation between quantum electrodynamics and various optical and molecular phenomena. In 1964, he published a book, Introductory Quantum Electrodynamics, based on a series of lectures he gave in Chile and the US.

Power retired as a professor in 1993, but remained active in research until his death following a short illness. He died on 31 January 2004, in London, England.

Selected publications

References

English physicists
1928 births
2004 deaths
Alumni of the University of London
British expatriates in the United States